Ma Kaiming (born August 1944 – 12 October 2007) was a Chinese politician of Yi ethnicity who served as governor of Liangshan Yi Autonomous Prefecture from 1991 to 1999. He was a delegate to the 8th and 9th National People's Congress.

Biography
Ma was born in Leibo County, Sichuan, in August 1944. In September 1963, he was accepted to Central University for Nationalities, where he graduated in October 1966.

Ma joined the Chinese Communist Party (CCP) in March 1966 and worked at Meigu County High School between 1968 and 1980. Starting in September 1980, he successively served as deputy magistrate, deputy party secretary, and magistrate of Meigu County. In March 1988, he was appointed as party secretary of Butuo County. In June 1988, he was admitted to member of the Standing Committee of the CCP Liangshan Yi Autonomous Prefectural Committee, the prefecture's top authority. In February 1990, he became vice governor of Liangshan Yi Autonomous Prefecture, rising to governor the next year. He was promoted to assistant governor of Sichuan in February 1999. In February 2001, he was promoted again to become vice governor of Sichuan. In January 2003, he was chosen as vice chairman of Sichuan Provincial People's Congress.

Ma died unexpectedly on 12 October 2007, at the age of 63.

References

1944 births
2007 deaths
People from Leibo County
Yi people
Minzu University of China alumni
Central Party School of the Chinese Communist Party alumni
People's Republic of China politicians from Jiangsu
Chinese Communist Party politicians from Jiangsu
Delegates to the 8th National People's Congress
Delegates to the 9th National People's Congress
Governors of Liangshan Yi Autonomous Prefecture